(I am content with my fortune), 84, is a church cantata by Johann Sebastian Bach. He composed the solo cantata for soprano in Leipzig in 1727 for the Sunday Septuagesima, and led the first performance, probably on 9 February 1727.

Bach composed the work in his fourth year as Thomaskantor in Leipzig. The text is similar to a cantata text  (I am content with my position), which Picander published in 1728, but it is not certain that he wrote also the cantata text. Its thoughts about being content are in the spirit of the beginning Enlightenment, expressed in simple language. The closing chorale is the 12th stanza of the hymn "" by Ämilie Juliane von Schwarzburg-Rudolstadt.  is one of the few works which Bach called "Cantata" himself.

Bach structured the work in five movements, alternating arias and recitatives, and a closing chorale. The scoring requires only a small ensemble of a soprano soloist, three additional vocal parts for the chorale, and a Baroque instrumental ensemble of oboe, strings and basso continuo. While the first aria is pensive and elegiac, the second aria is of dancing folk-like character.

History and words 
Bach wrote the solo cantata in Leipzig, in his fourth year as Thomaskantor (director of church music) in Leipzig, for the third Sunday before Lent, called Septuagesima. The prescribed readings for the Sunday were taken from the First Epistle to the Corinthians, "race for victory", and from the Gospel of Matthew, the parable of the Workers in the Vineyard. Bach had already composed two cantatas for the occasion in earlier years, in 1724, and the chorale cantata , in 1725.  is one of the few works which Bach called "Cantata" himself.

As in the earlier years, the cantata text is related to the gospel in the general way that the Christian should be content with his share of good fortune, without envy of others who may seem more fortunate. The title and the text show similarities to Picander's  (I am content with my position), published in 1728. It is unclear if both texts are by Picander, or if Picander based his on a former one, or if Picander's was already available at the time of the composition but was changed. As the Bach scholar Klaus Hofmann observes, the thoughts are in the spirit of the beginning Enlightenment, "praise of frugality, of modesty with that which God has allocated to us, of satisfaction, of lack of envy towards others". The language is no longer the "rhetorical pathos of baroque poetry", but "radicality and artistry of the imagery. The language is simple and terse; it is rational rather than figurative."

The closing chorale is the 12th stanza of the funeral hymn "" by Ämilie Juliane von Schwarzburg-Rudolstadt (1686).

Bach led the first performance, probably on 9 February 1727.

Music

Scoring and structure 
Bach structured the cantata in five movements. A sequence of alternating arias and recitatives is concluded by a chorale. Bach scored the work for soprano soloist, a four-part choir only in the chorale, and a Baroque instrumental ensemble of oboe (Ob), two violins (Vl), viola (Va), and basso continuo. The heading of the autograph score reads: "J.J. Dominica Septuagesimae Cantata", which means: "Jesus help. Cantata for the Sunday Septuagesima". Bach added a more precise extra page: "Dominica Septuages. / Ich bin vergnügt mit meinem Glücke / à / Soprano Solo è / 3 Ripieni / 1 Hautbois / 2 Violini / Viola / e Continuo / di / Joh:Seb:Bach". The scoring is modest, appropriate for the weeks leading to Lent. The duration is given as about 16 minutes.

In the following table of the movements, the scoring follows the Neue Bach-Ausgabe. The keys and time signatures are taken from the book on all cantatas by the Bach scholar Alfred Dürr, using the symbol for common time (4/4). The continuo, playing throughout, is not shown.

Movements 
Although the vocal and instrumental parts are limited, Bach achieves variety by movements of different instrumentation and character.

1 

The opening aria, "" (I am content with my fortune which our dear God has allotted me.), is slow and pensive, accompanied by all instruments, reminiscent of the slow movement of an oboe concerto. John Eliot Gardiner, who conducted in 2000 the Bach Cantata Pilgrimage, noted in the project diary that Bach, who possibly was not content with his situation in Leipzig, composed music portraying "ambivalence and complexity". His music is "dynamic and fluctuating", capturing "wistful, resigned, elegiac" moods. The musicologist Julian Mincham notes that the aria compares to Ich bin in mir vergnügt, BWV 204 (I am content in myself) which he describes as "also a highly personal work for solo soprano with a similar theme, exploring comparable human emotions".

2 
The first recitative, "" (God indeed owes me nothing), is secco.

3 
The second aria, "" (I eat my little bit of bread with joy and heartily leave to my neighbor his own.), is dancing and accompanied by two obbligato parts, oboe and violin. They express in vivid figuration in the violin and a slightly simplified version in the oboe the text "" (a happy spirit, a thankful heart, that gives praise). Hofmann observes that the aria depicts a "pastoral idyll with a rustic musical scene – a tribute to the Enlightenment utopia of simple, happy country life." The violin's figuration suggests the drone of bagpipes or hurdy-gurdy. The voice leaps in upward sixths, in "folk-like character" and conveying "contented tranquillity". Mincham notes that the first four notes of the oboe ritornello are the first four notes of the closing chorale turned to major.

4 

The second recitative, "" (In the sweat of my brow I will meanwhile enjoy my bread), is accompanied by the strings.

5 
The chorale, "" (Meanwhile, I live contented in You and die without any trouble), is a four-part setting of the tune "Wer nur den lieben Gott lässt walten" by Georg Neumark. Gardiner interprets the marking a soprano solo e a 3 ripieni (for soprano and three ripieno parts) as meaning that no instruments play colla parte with the voices.

Recordings 
The listing is taken from the selection provided on the Bach Cantatas Website. In the following table, ensembles playing on period instruments in historically informed performance are marked by a green background.

References

Sources 
 
 Ich bin vergnügt mit meinem Glücke BWV 84; BC A 43 / Sacred cantata (Septuagesima) Bach Digital
 BWV 84 Ich bin vergnügt mit meinem Glücke English translation, University of Vermont
 Luke Dahn: BWV 84.5 bach-chorales.com

External links 
 Ich bin vergnügt mit meinem Glücke, BWV 84: performance by the Netherlands Bach Society (video and background information)

Church cantatas by Johann Sebastian Bach
1727 compositions